, stylized as BEMANI, is Konami's music video game division. Originally named the Games & Music Division (G.M.D.), it changed its name in honor of its first and most successful game, Beatmania, and expanded into other music-based games, most notably rhythm games such as Dance Dance Revolution, Guitar Freaks, and Drum Mania.

Bemani games
Since 1997, Konami has released many different series of music games under the Bemani brand. Each series has a unique way of playing the game and detaches players from the typical hand held controller of modern game systems by using their whole body to control the game. Dance Dance Revolution lets players dance with their feet, Beatmania gives players a DJ style mixing board complete with turntable, ParaParaParadise is controlled with the players hands and arm by setting off motion sensors during the dance routine, and GuitarFreaks & DrumMania let players use simplified instruments to create music. Below are the Bemani series of video games in no particular order.

Beatmania

Modeled after nightclub DJs and mixing boards, Beatmania, known as Hip Hop Mania in North America and Beatstage in Korea, allows the player to "spin" the music with five activator keys and a turntable. The Beatmania series was the first Bemani game introduced and its successor is still the most popular Bemani game in Japan. With numerous releases in arcades and on video game platforms Beatmania set itself as a role model for future Bemani titles. The music featured in this series of games is still in use today in Beatmania IIDX and other Bemani games.

Beatmania IIDX

Continuing the Beatmania series, Beatmania IIDX (typically pronounced "Two Dee Ecks") was released in 1999. The rules of the game remain the same from Beatmania with the addition of two more keys giving players seven keys to play with along with the turntable. "IIDX" stands for 2 Deluxe, "Beatmania 2 Deluxe", as Konami gave the series an entire internal and external makeover. The deluxe versions of the arcade machines were bulked up with larger displays, a platform for players to stand on and literally feel the bass of the music, and other amenities. As time went on Konami ceased production of the standard cabinet and went exclusively with the deluxe cabinet.

Beatmania IIDX has been released on the PlayStation 2 and PC platforms for home players and continues to this day with arcade releases worldwide. In 2006, the game was released on the PlayStation 2 in North America for the first time, simply titled Beatmania.

Beatmania III

Built off the Beatmania gameplay, Beatmania III added a foot pedal to the five keys and turntable used by players. The Beatmania III series was short lived with only a few releases and a series run of only two years, ending in 2002. Many songs from Beatmania III were ported to the IIDX series as well as other Bemani games.

Dance Dance Revolution

Dance Dance Revolution, often initialized to DDR and also known in Europe as Dancing Stage, was first produced in 1998. The game is played by stepping to music on a dance platform with four pressure-sensitive arrow pads. The game has changed little since its introduction but has come a long way in terms of musical selection and visual appearance. While originally an arcade title, many versions of Dance Dance Revolution have been released on many different platforms including the Sony PlayStation 2, Sega Dreamcast, Nintendo Wii, and Microsoft Xbox. Other versions have also appeared on portable handhelds, cell phones, and as standalone TV plug'n'play devices. Dance Dance Revolution is commonly considered to be the most well-known BEMANI series outside of Japan.

Dance Dance Revolution Solo

An offshoot of the Dance Dance Revolution series, Dance Dance Revolution Solo added two additional arrows to the dance stage, but supported only single-player gameplay. The Solo series saw two major releases and two complementary releases before being canceled in 2001. Most of the music exclusive to Dance Dance Revolution Solo was reused in the main Dance Dance Revolution series.

Dance Maniax

Dance Maniax is an arcade video game controlled by two pairs of infrared motion sensors that detect movement of arms and legs. Several versions have been produced in 2000 and 2001. Instead of the usual concept of dropping notes in the genre (like Beatmania), they scroll up to the top of the screen instead. They can be judged as a "hit" or "miss", depending on the timing accuracy. The game featured a song list from Konami's in-house artists and Dancemania music label.

Pop'n Music

Released in 1998, Pop'n Music is like a simplified Beatmania. With larger, colorful buttons, no turntable, and easier note patterns, Pop'n Music presents players with a more childlike appearance. However Pop'n Music is viewed as every bit as difficult as Beatmania IIDX, with modes that use up to nine hand buttons at once, and having some songs that aren't keysounded. Pop'n Music is stylized with cute cartoony characters and a musical selection to match. The series continues to this day as one of the most popular Bemani games.

Pop'n Stage

Combining game elements from Dance Dance Revolution and Pop'n Music, Pop'n Stage takes the colorful buttons and lets players play the game on a stage with their feet. There was only one version of the game released.

GuitarFreaks and DrumMania

Also known as Gitadora in Japan, the combined series of Guitar Freaks and Drum Mania are games that use simplified instruments after their namesake. Guitar Freaks uses a small, plastic guitar with three buttons known as "frets", a strum bar, and a motion sensor that players set off by pulling the neck of the guitar up and quickly down again. Despite the similarities, Guitar Freaks predates Guitar Hero by several years; in fact, the heads of RedOctane, Charles and Kai Huang, were reportedly inspired by the GuitarFreaks gameplay to develop the Western game's guitar peripheral and pitch its gameplay proposal for what would eventually become Guitar Hero.

Drum Mania lets players play a set of drums. Modeled after modern digital drum kits, the player strikes the appropriate piece with the drumsticks on cue with the music and failure to do so causes the song to sound incorrect. Many American players will recognize the Drum Mania setup from more recent games like Rock Band, which is unrelated to the Konami game.

Similar to the 5-key to 7-key upgrade from Beatmania to Beatmania IIDX, Guitar Freaks and Drum Mania received a major gameplay overhaul with the 2010 release of Guitar Freaks XG and Drum Mania XG, with a total of 5 frets and 9 drums respectively. While standard Guitar Freaks and Drum Mania games were originally being released alongside the XG games, the latter has now become the primary focus of the series, with the last standard series game being V8, released in 2011. The XG series was rebranded in 2013 as simply "GITADORA".

Despite being separately released games that can be played independent of each other, Konami markets the GITADORA series as a pair that can be linked for co-operative play in the arcades. The two series continue to be released to this day.

Keyboardmania

A MIDI synthesizer game. Keyboardmania features a mini-musical keyboard and players create the primarily piano based music by striking the keys to the note patterns on the screen. Keyboardmania saw only three major releases before being canceled but features exceptionally difficult and unique gameplay for the Bemani series of games. "Real Mode" actually requires players to know how to play the piano in order to easily pass the songs.

Keyboardmania can be multi-session linked with certain versions of the GuitarFreaks and DrumMania series.

Para Para Paradise

Built around the Para Para dance style made popular in Japan, Para Para Paradise recreates official dance moves within the game by setting off arrows on screen by using players' hands under a set of motion sensors. The music in the game centers around Eurobeat and features songs from Konami and Avex Trax. Only three versions of the game were released as Para Para dancing fell out of mainstream popularity in Japan, and the series never saw light outside of the country beyond music game importers and localized Korean versions of the arcade machines.

Jubeat

Announced on December 22, 2007, Jubeat (pronounced "you beat", title changed to UBeat and Jukebeat in the American test releases) is similar to Whac-A-Mole, where players must tap the square-shaped panels on a touch screen when they light up. It was released in Japan in July 2008. A localized version of the game for North America was announced the month after with tests held at an arcade in Southern California alongside Dance Dance Revolution X. After two separate testing phases Konami canceled all plans to release the game in North American Arcades. Jubeat arcade presence is localized in Japan and several East Asian countries.  Free-to-Play adaptations for mobile were eventually released in 2010.  Japan received Jubeat Plus, available for iOS and Android. International regions received a localized version called Jukebeat, available solely on iOS. While the apps may appear similar, Jukebeat songlist is far more restricted and features different licences.

Bemani Pocket

Similar in style to Tamagotchi handhelds, the Bemani Pocket series released small, handheld versions of Dance Dance Revolution, Beatmania, and ParaParaParadise intended to be played with one's fingers. Rarer Pop'n Music and GuitarFreaks variants were produced later on.

Reflec Beat

Reflec Beat was first released on November 4, 2010. Its gameplay is similar to air hockey, but Reflec Beat uses fingers. Players must touch circular symbols that match the color of their line moving to the player at the right time. It features a one-on-one matching system. Mobile adaptations for iOS were made in 2011, with Japan receiving Reflec Beat Plus and international regions receiving a localized version called Reflec Beat + in 2012. Like Jukebeat, Reflec Beat + contains a more restricted song list, with no licensed tracks at all.

SOUND VOLTEX 

SOUND VOLTEX was first released on January 18, 2012. Its gameplay involves four white buttons, two orange "FX" buttons, and two knobs, one blue and one pink. While the white and orange buttons are simply pressed or held, the knobs must be adjusted on cue with blue and pink lasers which quickly move left and right across the track. Similar to beatmania, this gameplay is meant to mimic a DJ controller, but places more focus on layering effects over the music. Besides music featured in other BEMANI series, many songs are arrangements of music from Touhou Project, and some are produced by Vocaloid artists. SOUND VOLTEX also holds regular song contests, officially called SOUND VOLTEX FLOOR, in which fans submit original songs (sometimes including artwork) for a chance to be part of the game's extensive setlist.

Dance Evolution ARCADE

A Kinect-based game called Dance Evolution ARCADE is also considered a part of Bemani series, previously being exclusive to Xbox 360. It was released on March 27, 2012. Its gameplay is similar to the original game, in which players must follow the in-game character's movements by touching and drawing line on the air correspondingly with the movement. The game ceased receiving e-Amusement service on August 31, 2016, discontinuing most cabinets that require constant e-Amusement connection, installing the offline patch and effectively terminating support for the game.

Mirai Dagakki FutureTomTom

Mirai Dagakki (ミライダガッキ) FutureTomTom was first released on June 20, 2013. Its gameplay involves hitting drums to match the notes on the screen, akin to Taiko no Tatsujin. The game ceased receiving e-Amusement service on July 31, 2015, discontinuing most cabinets that require constant e-Amusement connection, installing the offline patch and effectively terminating support for the game.

BeatStream

Released on July 17, 2014 and discontinued on March 1, 2017, its gameplay involves hitting notes that come from eight directions to an octagonal judgment lines within a wide touch panel. The notes have several types: some need to be held down, and some need to be slid. Similar to Beatmania IIDX, the player starts with 30% clear gauge (represented by a ring in the middle of the screen) and have to obtain at least 70% by the end of the game to pass the stage. The music library features a good number of songs from Vocaloid and Touhou Project, like Sound Voltex, but BeatStream does have its fair share of original songs. e-Amusement support for BeatStream ended on September 1, 2017, discontinuing most cabinets that require constant e-Amusement connection, doing the game unable to run after boot and recycling cabinets for other games.

MÚSECA

First released on December 10, 2015 after 5 location tests, MÚSECA gameplay involves a pedal and 5 spinners which can be pressed, held or rotated, depending on the note type. One of MÚSECA most important aspects are the illustrations named Grafica. A Grafica gives the player GIFTs, which are in-game bonuses that are auto-triggered at some points of the charts, slightly modifying the chart lane's judgment line. GIFTs include Life Support, Score Gain, Play Risk, and Item Collect. Most Grafica characters have their own voices that play when they're triggered in-game. The game ceased receiving e-Amusement service on July 31, 2018, discontinuing most cabinets that require constant e-Amusement connection, installing the offline patch, recycling some cabinets for other games and effectively terminating support for the game.

NOSTALGIA

 was first released on March 1, 2017, available as an upgrade kit for BeatStream cabinets or as a new machine. The game serves as a spiritual successor to Keyboardmania, with its gameplay involving a keyboard-esque controller used to hit notes coming from the top of the screen. Unlike Keyboardmania though, the player does not have to hit a specific key, just one in the note's general area. Only one row of keys is used as well; while the cabinet does have black keys, they are solely for decoration. The touchscreen used by BeatStream is reused to navigate the game's interface. Similar to Keyboardmania, "Real" charts requires players to know how to play the piano in order to easily pass the songs.

DANCERUSH
DANCERUSH was first released on March 23, 2018. Similar to other Bemani series like Dance Dance Revolution and Dance Evolution, Dance Rush has 3 game modes: Light (up to 2 songs), Standard (up to 2 songs, plus Extra Stage) and Premium (record any song and upload them to YouTube). It uses Microsoft Kinect-like hardware and a touchpad-like dance stage. Dance Rush has four buttons for navigating the menu.

DANCE aROUND
Introduced on November 10, 2021 DANCE aROUND began location tests in select portions of the Japanese market through November 2021. Unlike its predecessors DANCERUSH or Dance Dance Revolution, DANCE aROUND uses cameras in combination with "real-time AI" to generate an avatar on screen that mimics the players movements in the real world. The game features two different styles of dancing: a simple mode using only hands, and an advanced mode that uses full body tracking. DANCE aROUND is most closely comparable to the Just Dance game series.

Martial Beat
Martial Beat was designed for the PlayStation in Japan in 2001. It is based on the players' actions by use of wristband sensors. The game was shipped in a modified Dance Dance Revolution cabinet, with the sensors and the game's art on it. Although there are two sets of selection buttons (as Dance Dance Revolution supported two players), the game is one player only. To play the game, one needs to follow the on-screen instructor, and when a red light turns on located on top of the screen, the player must perform the move by repeating the instructor.

Bemani artists

In addition to licensed music tracks, primarily from Toshiba EMI and Avex Trax, Konami employs a list of in-house artists to produce the music for its Bemani series, which in 2017 started being referred to as the "BEMANI Sound Team". These artists often go by pseudonyms when credited with their songs. Some Konami employees have broken off and become independent artists.

References

External links
Konami company website

 
Konami
Lists of video games by franchise